Franco Bodrero (7 February 1943 – 31 July 1970) was an Italian racing cyclist. He rode in the 1967 Tour de France.

References

External links
 

1943 births
1970 deaths
Italian male cyclists
Place of birth missing
Cyclists from Turin